Remembering Tomorrow is an album by pianist Steve Kuhn recorded in 1995 and released on the ECM label.

Reception 
The Allmusic review by Scott Yanow awarded the album 2 stars, stating "most of this set is rather sleepy and melancholy, not living up to the potential of these talented musicians".

Track listing 
All compositions by Steve Kuhn except as indicated

 "The Rain Forest" - 4:04
 "Oceans in the Sky" - 7:58
 "Lullaby" - 4:52
 "Trance" - 8:03
 "Life's Backward Glance" - 5:15
 "All the Rest is the Same" - 7:37
 "Emmanuel" (Michael Colombier) - 5:07
 "Remembering Tomorrow" - 7:55
 "The Felling Within" - 6:02
 "Bittersweet Passages" - 4:48
 "Silver" - 6:53

Personnel 
 Steve Kuhn - piano
 David Finck - bass
 Joey Baron - drums

References 

ECM Records albums
Steve Kuhn albums
Albums produced by Manfred Eicher
1996 albums